Dearborn County Courthouse is a historic courthouse located at Lawrenceburg, Dearborn County, Indiana.  It was built in 1870–71, and is a three-story, five bay, Greek Revival style building constructed of limestone.  It features a three bay pedimented portico with four fluted columns with Corinthian order capitals.

It was added to the National Register of Historic Places in 1981. It is located in the Downtown Lawrenceburg Historic District.

References

External links

County courthouses in Indiana
Courthouses on the National Register of Historic Places in Indiana
Greek Revival architecture in Indiana
Government buildings completed in 1871
Buildings and structures in Dearborn County, Indiana
National Register of Historic Places in Dearborn County, Indiana
1871 establishments in Indiana
Historic district contributing properties in Indiana